Uppal metro station is located on the Blue Line of the Hyderabad Metro. It is near to Kendriya Vidyalaya, Uppal X Roads, Uppal Police station, Karachi Bakery, Rajlakshmi Theatre, Uppal Bus stop.

History
It was opened on  29 November 2017.

The station

Structure
Uppal elevated metro station situated on the Blue Line of Hyderabad Metro.

Station layout
Street Level This is the first level where passengers may park their vehicles and view the local area map.

Concourse level Ticketing office or Ticket Vending Machines (TVMs) is located here. Retail outlets and other facilities like washrooms, ATMs, first aid, etc., will be available in this area.

Platform level  This layer consists of two platforms. Trains takes passengers from this level.

Entry/exit

See also

References

Hyderabad Metro stations